Sushma Swaraj of Bharatiya Janata Party was Chief Minister of Delhi from 12 October 1998 to 3 December 1998.

List of Ministers
The names of the ministers of her ministry are:

 Sushma Swaraj - Chief minister, Home
 Harsh Vardhan - Health and Family Welfare, Education
 Jagdish Mukhi - Excise, Technical Education, Finance
 Purnima Sethi - Civil supplies & environment
 Devender Singh Shokeen - Transport
 Harsharan Singh Balli - Industry, Labour, Jails, Languages and Gurudwara Administration
 Surendra Pal Ratawal - Welfare, Labour, Tourism and Employment

References

1998 establishments in Delhi
1998 disestablishments in India
1990s in Delhi
Bharatiya Janata Party state ministries
Delhi cabinets
1998 in India
Cabinets disestablished in 1998
Cabinets established in 1998